Ephrem is a masculine given name, a variant spelling of Ephraim (also spelled  Efrem, Ephraem). It is the name of biblical Ephraim, a son of Joseph and ancestor of the Tribe of Ephraim.

People

First name

Pre-Modern
 Saint Ephrem, one of the Hieromartyrs of Cherson (died )
 Saint Ephrem the Syrian (306–373)
 Ephrem Mtsire, Georgian monk (died 1101)

Modern
 Ignatius Aphrem I Barsoum, Syriac Orthodox Patriarch of Antioch (1887–1957)
 Ignatius Ephrem II Rahmani, Syriac Catholic Patriarch of Antioch (1848–1929)
 Ignatius Aphrem II, Syriac Orthodox Patriarch of Antioch (born 1965)
 Efrem Forni, Italian Cardinal (1889–1976)
 Efrem Hill, American football player (born 1983)
 Efrem Kurtz, Russian conductor (1900–1995)
 Ephrem M'Bom, Cameroonian football player (born 1954)
 Efrem Schulz, American musician (born 1975)
 Efrem Zimbalist, Russian-born American violinist (1890–1985)
 Efrem Zimbalist Jr., American actor (1918–2014)

Surname
Georgios Efrem, Cypriot football player (b. 1989)
Mérovée Ephrem, French figure skater (b. 1990)
Sebhat Ephrem, Eritrean general and politician (b. 1951)

See also
Ephraim (disambiguation)